A terraced wall, also a terrace wall, or a terraced retaining wall is a wall that is divided into sections (terraces) over a slope. Such designs are useful when building on a steep grade. Terraced walls may be built with many different materials.

Some craters have terraced walls, which includes complex craters.

Types of terraced walls

A partially terraced wall is designed so that the upper terrace and lower terrace come back together, forming a taller wall. The wall may still work well, but may have aesthetic issues.

There are two types. In an independent terraced wall, the upper wall applies little or no weight load on the lower wall. In a dependent terraced wall, the upper wall places a weight load on the lower wall.

See also

 Buttress
 Buttress dam
 Flying buttress
 Load-bearing wall
 Retaining wall
 Terrace (building)
 Terrace (earthworks)
 Terrace garden

References

External links and references

 Information on building a terraced garden
 US government's NASA on a crater with a terraced wall
 A youtube, on constructing a terrace wall
 Another youtube
 A youtube, on building rock walls for garden terraces

Types of wall